Skywell may refer to:

 An alternative name for a lightwell, an open or windowed space in a ceiling to allow light to flow into a room.
 Skywell New Energy Automobile Group, owner of 
Nanjing Golden Dragon Bus
Skyworth Auto